Intree Chantarasatit Stadium is the main multi-purpose stadium of Kasetsart University, on the university's main campus in Chatuchak District, Bangkok, Thailand.  It is one of several stadia used by the Kasetsart F.C.  The stadium holds 4,000 people.

References 

Football venues in Thailand
Multi-purpose stadiums in Thailand
Sports venues in Bangkok